Manawhenua was a New Zealand rugby union team which briefly existed as an amalgamation of the Manawatu and Horowhenua unions. The merger lasted from 1925 until 1933.

Ranfurly Shield
In Manawhenua's short existence it managed to take part in six Ranfurly Shield matches between 1927 and 1929. Manawhenua had three successful matches in 1927 when it took the Shield off Wairarapa and defended it twice before losing to Canterbury.

1927
6-8-27, Carterton, Manawhenua 18 vs Wairarapa 16 
31-8-27, Palmerston North, Manawhenua 9 vs Taranaki 3
3-9-27, Palmerston North, Manawhenua 25 vs Wanganui 6
7-9-27, Palmerston North, Canterbury 17 vs Manawhenua 6

1928
15-9-28, Carterton, Wairarapa 31 vs Manawhenua 10

1929
17-8-29, Masterton, Wairarapa 37 vs Manawhenua 16

References
Ranfurly Shield at scrum.co.nz
 The Shield, By Lindsay Knight

Defunct New Zealand rugby union teams
Defunct New Zealand rugby union governing bodies
Sport in Manawatū-Whanganui
1925 establishments in New Zealand
1933 disestablishments in New Zealand
Sports organizations established in 1925